The Boston Massachusetts Temple is the 100th operating temple of the Church of Jesus Christ of Latter-day Saints (LDS Church).

History
The Boston Massachusetts Temple is located in the suburb of Belmont, Massachusetts and was dedicated for use on October 1, 2000. When LDS Church president Gordon B. Hinckley announced the building of small temples in April 1998, he also spoke of a goal to have 100 temples built by the end of 2000. The Boston Massachusetts Temple marked the completion of that goal.

Richard G. Scott, of the Quorum of the Twelve Apostles, presided over the groundbreaking on June 13, 1997, and the building was completed three years later. About 82,600 visitors toured the temple during an open-house prior to its dedication. A local radio station and newspaper working together produced the first on-line tours of a temple. It included narration accompanied by photographs of the temple's interior.

Because of a lawsuit filed by neighbors of the temple site, the Boston Massachusetts Temple was dedicated without the planned steeple. Hinckley remained optimistic and said the temple work would commence with or without a steeple. His optimism was rewarded when the Supreme Court of Massachusetts ruled in favor of the church the following May. Previously, a judge had ruled that the building's steeple was not a "necessary element of the Mormon religion." Therefore, under the law the building height limit could be enforced. But the Supreme Court overruled the earlier ruling saying, "A rose window at Notre Dame Cathedral, a balcony at St. Peter's Basilica, are judges to decide whether these architectural elements are 'necessary' to the faith served by those buildings?" The judges concluded that, "It is not for judges to determine whether the inclusion of a particular architectural feature is 'necessary' for a particular religion." On September 21, 2001, the steeple with the famous angel Moroni was set in place, completing the temple.

The exterior is finished with olympia white granite.

In 2020, the Boston Massachusetts Temple was closed in response to the coronavirus pandemic.

Presidents
Notable presidents of the temple include Loren C. Dunn (2000–01), Robert S. Wood (2009–12), Steven C. Wheelwright (2015–2018), Lloyd S. Baird (2015–2018), and Lee Roy LaPierre (2021–)

See also

 Comparison of temples of The Church of Jesus Christ of Latter-day Saints
 Dover Amendment
 Temple architecture (LDS Church)
 List of temples of The Church of Jesus Christ of Latter-day Saints
 List of temples of The Church of Jesus Christ of Latter-day Saints by geographic region
 The Church of Jesus Christ of Latter-day Saints in Massachusetts

References

Additional reading

External links
 Official Boston Massachusetts Temple page
 Boston Massachusetts Temple at ChurchofJesusChristTemples.org
 G Brown Design, Inc., Site and Landscape Architectural firm for this temple
 Suburban Bostonians try to halt completion of Mormon temple - The Associated Press
 Links to many news stories about the controversies dealing with the construction of this temple
 

20th-century Latter Day Saint temples
Belmont, Massachusetts
Religious buildings and structures in Boston
Temples (LDS Church) completed in 2000
Temples (LDS Church) in the United States
2000 establishments in Massachusetts
Mormonism-related controversies
Temples in Massachusetts
Buildings and structures in Middlesex County, Massachusetts